Hardwick House may refer to the following buildings:

 Hardwick House (Quincy, Massachusetts), United States
 Hardwick House, Oxfordshire, England
 Hardwick House, Suffolk, England
 Hardwick House, a Grade II* listed building in Shrewsbury, Shropshire, England
 Hardwick House, a building near Swineshead, Lincolnshire, England

See also
Hardwicke House, a British sitcom
 Hardwick Hall, Derbyshire, England